Mulondo may refer to
 Mulondo, Lanao del Sur, a municipality in the province of Lanao del Sur, Philippines
 Mulondo, Angola, a town in Angola
Mulondo of Buganda, a 16th-century African ruler
Besueri Kiwanuka Lusse Mulondo (born 1926), Ugandan politician